was a Japanese samurai of the Sengoku period. Also known as Toshiharu , he was the son of Maeda Toshitaka. His seat was Arako Castle in Owari Province. Toshimasa was a vassal of Oda Nobuhide, who nominally ruled Owari Province from his seat at Kiyosu Castle.

Family
Father: Maeda Toshitaka
Wife: Nagayowai-in (d. 1573)
 First son: Maeda Toshihisa (d. 1587?)
 Second son: Maeda Toshifusa
 Fourth son: Maeda Toshiie (1539–1599), lord of the "Million Koku Kaga Domain".
 Fifth son: Sawaki Yoshiyuki (d. 1573)
unknown
 Third son: Maeda Yasukatsu (d. 1594)
 Sixth son: Maeda Hidetsugu (d. 1586) 
 First daughter: Maeda Masa (given in marriage to Takabatake Sadayoshi)

Popular culture
Maeda Toshimasa was depicted by Bunta Sugawara in the 2002 NHK historical drama Toshiie to Matsu .

References 

Samurai
Japanese Buddhists
1560 deaths
Maeda clan
Year of birth unknown